Tarmaber (Amharic: ጣርማበር) is a woreda in Amhara Region, Ethiopia. It includes a homonymous mountain pass and road tunnel. Located at the eastern edge of the Ethiopian Highlands in the Semien Shewa Zone, Termaber is bordered on the south by Ankober, on the southwest by Basona Werana, on the west by Mojana Wadera, on the northwest by Menz Mam Midir, on the northeast by Kewet, and on the southeast by the Afar Region. Towns in this woreda include Debre Sina and Doqaqit.

This woreda was originally named Mafud Mezezo Mojana, which is the name the 1994 national census used for it, but the name was changed at some point over the next five years. In 1999, the woreda of Mojana Wadera was split off from Termaber, and a kebele transferred to it from Kewet.

Tegulet, the ancient capital of the Ethiopian Empire, lies in this woreda. The city was established in 1270 by Yekuno Amlak after he overthrew the Zagwe Dynasty. Although G.W.B. Huntingford speculates that the settlement of Tegulet first became the capital of Ethiopia during Wedem Arad's reign. In 1528 the city was seized by the forces of Ahmad ibn Ibrahim who ordered the destruction of the city and it's royal residence.

Demographics
Based on the 2007 national census conducted by the Central Statistical Agency of Ethiopia (CSA), this woreda has a total population of 84,481, an increase of over the 1994 census, of whom 42,812 are men and 41,669 women; 10,304 or 12.20% are urban inhabitants. With an area of 543.33 square kilometers, Termaber has a population density of 155.49, which is greater than the Zone average of 115.3 persons per square kilometer. A total of 19,993 households were counted in this woreda, resulting in an average of 4.23 persons to a household, and 19,370 housing units. The majority of the inhabitants practiced Ethiopian Orthodox Christianity, with 97.43% reporting that as their religion, while 2.37% of the population said they were Muslim.

The 1994 national census reported a total population for this woreda of 99,402 in 17,787 households, of whom 51,537 were men and 47,865 were women; 8,378 or 8.43% of its population were urban dwellers. The three largest ethnic groups reported in Termaber were the Amhara (93.78%), the Oromo (3.11%), and the Argobba (2.65%); all other ethnic groups made up 0.46% of the population. Amharic was spoken as a first language by 96.93%, and Oromiffa was spoken by 2.76%; the remaining 0.31% spoke all other primary languages reported. The majority of the inhabitants practiced Ethiopian Orthodox Christianity, with 94.74% reporting that as their religion, while 5.15% were Muslim.

Notes

Districts of Amhara Region